A utility helicopter is a multi-purpose helicopter capable of fulfilling many different roles.

Civil
Many civilian helicopters are made for utility work such as agricultural aircraft. Many police and fire departments maintain and operate utility helicopters to augment their regular forces. In many countries local hospital services operate medevac helicopters for special time-sensitive cases.

Military 
A utility military helicopter can fill roles such as ground attack, air assault, military logistics, CASEVAC, medical evacuation, command and control, and troop transport. Some overlap of terminology is inevitable with transport helicopter.

Prominent examples of utility helicopters include the American Bell Huey family, Russian Mil Mi-2 series and the French Aérospatiale Alouette III.

See also
 Cargo hook (helicopter)
 Utility aircraft

References

External links

Lists of aircraft by role